The Legend (subtitled From the Pen of Benny Carter) is an album by pianist, composer and bandleader Count Basie featuring tracks composed by Benny Carter recorded in 1961 and originally released on the Roulette label.

Reception

AllMusic awarded the album 4½ out of 5 stars.

Track listing
All compositions by Benny Carter
 "The Trot" - 3:09 	
 "Easy Money" - 5:19
 "Amoroso" - 3:47
 "Goin' On" - 4:24
 "The Swizzle" - 3:31
 "The Legend" - 4:35
 "Who's Blue?" - 4:30
 "Turnabout" - 3:56
Recorded in New York City on October 30, 1961 (tracks 1, 4 & 6), November 1, 1961 (tracks 5 & 7) and November 2, 1961 (tracks 2, 3 & 8)

Personnel 
Count Basie - piano
Al Aarons, Sonny Cohn, Thad Jones, Snooky Young  - trumpet
Henry Coker, Quentin Jackson, Benny Powell - trombone
Benny Carter, Frank Wess - alto saxophone
Frank Foster, Budd Johnson - tenor saxophone
Charlie Fowlkes - baritone saxophone
Sam Herman - guitar
Eddie Jones - bass
Sonny Payne - drums
Benny Carter - arranger

References 

1961 albums
Count Basie Orchestra albums
Roulette Records albums
Albums produced by Teddy Reig